List of communities in Pictou County, Nova Scotia

Many of the communities have Gaelic names.

Communities are ordered by the highway upon which they are located.  All routes start with the terminus located near the largest community.

Towns

New Glasgow - Stellarton - Pictou - Westville - Trenton - Thorburn

Trunk Routes

Trunk 4: Salt Springs - West River - Greenhill - Alma - New Glasgow - French River - Broadway - Barney's River Station - Marshy Hope
Trunk 6: Marshville - River John - Seafoam - Toney River - Caribou River

Collector Roads

Route 245: Egerton  - Merigomish  - Lower Barney's River  - Lismore  - Knoydart
Route 256: West Branch River John - Scotsburn - Lyons Brook
Route 289: Little Harbour - New Glasgow - Westville - Rocklin - Lansdowne
Route 347: New Glasgow - Priestville- Coalburn- Thorburn - Greenwood - McPhersons Mills - Meiklefield - Blue Mountain  - Moose River - Garden of Eden - Eden Lake- Rocky Mountain - Willowdale - East River- East River St. Marys
Route 348: Little Harbour  - Chance Harbour  - Pictou Landing - Trenton - New Glasgow  - Stellarton - Churchville  - Springville  - Bridgeville  - Glencoe  - Sunnybrae
Route 374: New Glasgow - Riverton - Eureka - Hopewell - Lorne - Trafalgar
Route 376: West River - Durham

Communities located on rural roads

Alma
Avondale
Bailey Brook
Black River
Cape John
Elgin
Glengarry
Granton
Green's Brook
Hodson
Iron Ore
Meadowville
Mount Thom
New Gairlock
Pictou Island
Piedmont
St. Pauls
Sutherland's River
Sylvester
Watervale
Welsford
West River Station

See also

Pictou County